Denver Lopez (born September 2, 1980) is a Filipino retired professional basketball player who last played for the Rain or Shine Elasto Painters in the Philippine Basketball Association (PBA). He was drafted sixth overall by Red Bull in 2004.

Player profile
Lopez played for Red Bull as a rookie and he averaged 9.7 points per game and 2.2 assists per game. He also played for the San Miguel Beermen in the 2005–06 PBA season. After three seasons with Rain or Shine, he retired in 2009 because of career-long injuries.

PBA career statistics

Season-by-season averages

|-
| align="left" | 
| align="left" | Red Bull / San Miguel
| 61 || 15.7 || .339 || .336 || .478 || 1.6 || 1.4 || .3 || .1 || 3.7
|-
| align="left" | 
| align="left" | San Miguel
| 28 || 10.1 || .353 || .346 || .667 || .5 || .5 || .3 || .1 || 1.9
|-
| align="left" | 
| align="left" | Welcoat
| 33 || 28.6 || .377 || .369 || .753 || 2.2 || 2.2 || .5 || .1 || 9.7
|-
| align="left" | 
| align="left" | Welcoat
| 15 || 27.8 || .323 || .217 || .667 || 2.1 || 2.9 || .6 || .3 || 7.7
|-
| align="left" | 
| align="left" | Rain or Shine
| 3 || 6.7 || .300 || .286 || .000 || .3 || .0 || .0 || .0 || 2.7
|-
| align="left" | Career
| align="left" |
| 140 || 18.7 || .352 || .328 || .652 || 1.6 || 1.6 || .4 || .1 || 5.2

References

1980 births
Living people
Barako Bull Energy Boosters players
Basketball players from Metro Manila
Cal State Fullerton Titans men's basketball players
Filipino men's basketball players
People from Caloocan
Point guards
Rain or Shine Elasto Painters players
San Miguel Beermen players
Shooting guards
Filipino expatriate basketball people in the United States
Barako Bull Energy Boosters draft picks